Debora Kay Iyall (born 29 April 1954), is a Cowlitz Native American artist and was lead singer for the new wave band Romeo Void. Iyall got her surname from her family adopting their ancestor Iyallwahawa's "first" name written at the time as Ayiel.

Early life

She was born in 1954 in Soap Lake, Washington, and grew up in Fresno, California. 
In 1969, at age fourteen, Iyall joined the Occupation of Alcatraz and stayed for six days. She had hoped to connect with the Native American activist community there, but felt "out of place".

Romeo Void

While attending the San Francisco Art Institute, she joined Frank Zincavage and Peter Woods to create Romeo Void in 1979. The band was notable for their modernization of the punk sound, and for Iyall's forceful, half-spoken delivery. They reached hit status on college radio stations with the suggestive and multi-leveled song "Never Say Never" in 1982. Their song "A Girl in Trouble (Is a Temporary Thing)" landed them in the top 40 of Billboard's Hot 100 chart, and an appearance on Dick Clark's American Bandstand in 1984.

Solo albums and art career

Romeo Void parted ways in 1985, and the following year Iyall released her debut solo album Strange Language on Columbia Records. After a lukewarm reception of the album, Iyall returned to her first love, as an artist and art instructor. Throughout the 1990s she taught art at the 29 Palms Cultural Center and for the Arts Council for San Bernardino. She also led hikes and made presentations for the Agua Caliente Cultural Museum as a paid docent, and in 1995 she started Ink Clan, a print shop dedicated to teaching screen printing and other arts to young Native artists. Ink Clan was once housed in the South of Market Cultural Center in San Francisco. She presently resides in New Mexico, with her husband, audio engineer and instructor Patrick Haight.

Since late 2009, Iyall has been performing new material written with Peter Dunne at a variety of local venues in Northern California. In 2010 Iyall's second solo album, Stay Strong, was released, and in January 2012, an EP, Singing Until Sunrise, was released. On 2 November 2019, Debora Iyall was awarded as a Lifetime Achievement Honoree at the 19th Annual Native American Music Awards.

Discography
 Strange Language (1986)
 Stay Strong (2010)
 Singing Until Sunrise (2012)

References

External links
Iyall professional website

1954 births
Living people
20th-century American printmakers
20th-century American women artists
20th-century American singers
20th-century American women singers
20th-century Native Americans
21st-century American printmakers
21st-century American women artists
21st-century American singers
21st-century American women singers
21st-century Native Americans
American new wave musicians
Artists from California
Artists from Washington (state)
Coast Salish people
Columbia Records artists
Women new wave singers
Musicians from Fresno, California
Native American printmakers
Native American singers
Native American women artists
People from Soap Lake, Washington
San Francisco Art Institute alumni
Singers from California
Singers from Washington (state)
American women printmakers
20th-century Native American women
21st-century Native American women
Women punk rock singers